Lieutenant Hiromi Nakayama (died 10 August 1946) was an Imperial Japanese Army soldier and convicted war criminal.

The Imperial Japanese Army during World War II, undertook Operation RY on 26 August 1942, with a company (100 men) of the 43rd Guard Force (Palau), led by Lieutenant Nakayama were inserted on Nauru and took occupation on the island. Lieutenant Nakayama executed Colonel F. R. Chalmers and four other prisoners of war in March 1943. Captured after the surrender of Japanese forces on Nauru on 13 September 1945, he was then transported to Rabaul, as a prisoner of war. Tried at an Australian Military Court trial held in Rabaul in May 1946, Lieutenant Nakayama was sentenced to death for the crime of killing the five Australians on Nauru, and was hanged on 10 August.

References

Year of birth unknown
1946 deaths
Imperial Japanese Army personnel of World War II
Japanese people executed for war crimes
Japanese people executed abroad
Imperial Japanese Army officers
People executed by Australia by hanging